State Road 47 (SR 47) is a north–south state highway in north Florida, running from US 41/441 in Lake City south to US 129 in Trenton. North of Lake City, SR 47 is the "secret" designation for US 441 to the Georgia border, continuing as State Route 89.

Names for SR 47 include SR 47 in both Gilchrist and Columbia Counties and South First Street, North First Street, Columbia City Road, East Duval Street, North Marion Street, and US 441 in Columbia County.

State Road 47 is currently facing a major widening project between US 41-441 and Interstate 75 at Exit 423.

Major intersections

References

External links

State Road 47 Expansion from Interstate 75 to US 41 (FDOT)
Florida Route Log (SR 47)

047
047
047